Cretacimermis is a collective group genus of fossil nematodes from the Cretaceous that cannot be placed in extant genera.

Species
 †C. aphidophilus Poinar, 2017
 †C. chironomae Poinar, 2011
 †C. libani (Poinar, Acra & Acra, 1994)
 †C. protus Poinar & Buckley, 2006

See also
 Heydenius

References

Mermithidae
Prehistoric protostome genera
Enoplea genera
Taxa named by George Poinar Jr.